Zlatko Tomčić (born 10 July 1945) is a Croatian politician who served as President of the Croatian Peasant Party from 1994 to 2005, as Speaker of the Croatian Parliament from 2000 to 2003, as a representative in the Croatian Parliament, and as acting President of Croatia in February 2000. 

He graduated from the Belgrade Faculty of Civil Engineering.

Tomčić became president of the HSS in 1994 while serving as Minister of Construction and Environment in the HDZ-led cabinet of Nikica Valentić. Under his leadership, the Peasant Party led the coalition that came in second in the 1995 election, winning 18 seats, of which 10 went to members of the HSS, including Tomčić.

In the 2000 election, the HSS-led coalition came in third, winning 25 seats, of which 17 went to the HSS.  These parties joined with the election winners (SDP-HSLS coalition) to form the government, and Tomčić became Speaker of the Parliament. He was instated on 2 February 2000.

As speaker of the Parliament, Tomčić also briefly served as acting president of Croatia, as the post was at the time vacant due to the death of President Franjo Tuđman in December 1999. He gave up the position to the newly elected president Stjepan Mesić on 19 February 2000.

Tomčić remained speaker until December 2003, following new elections where the party lost seats and went into the opposition. Tomčić did, however, keep a seat in the Parliament.

In 2005, the HSS ten-member club in the Parliament split between a group supporting Tomčić and another one insisting on change in leadership. In the party election of December 2005, Tomčić was opposed by Josip Friščić and defeated. After defeat he gave up his parliament seat and left politics.

As of 2011, Tomčić is the CEO of a small architecture firm.

References

1945 births
Living people
Politicians from Zagreb
Representatives in the modern Croatian Parliament
Speakers of the Croatian Parliament
Croatian Peasant Party politicians
Presidents of Croatia
University of Belgrade Faculty of Civil Engineering alumni
Place of birth missing (living people)
Government ministers of Croatia